Valle de la Orotava is a Spanish Denominación de Origen Protegida (DOP) for wines located on the north-western coastline of Tenerife, (Canary Islands, Spain), and acquired its DO in 1995.

History
This area was one of the first one planted to vines when the Canary Islands were occupied by Spain in the 15th century. The area given over to vines has diminished steadily over during the course of the 20th century due to increasing competition from banana plantations.

Geography
The vineyards are located on the fertile slopes of the Teide, a volcano and extend down to the port of Puerto de la Cruz. There are 671 ha registered with the DO.

The Valle de la Orotava (Orotava Valley) is not strictly speaking a valley at all, but the local name for the lower slopes of the Teide. The vineyards are at an average height of around 800 m above sea-level.

Soils
70% of the soil is volcanic, 20% clay and the remaining 10% is volcanic rock. The soils are light, permeable, rich in minerals and slightly acidic.

Climate
The climate is hot and humid due to the influence of the Atlantic Ocean, with a high index of annual sunlight hours. Temperatures are high in summer and the vineyards are often shrouded in mist caused by the humidity bearing trade winds which blow all year round. This allows the vines to thrive though at times they are affected by sudden storms and strong gusts of wind.

Authorised Grape Varieties
The authorised grape varieties are:
 Red: Castellana Negra, Listán Negro / Almuñeco, Malvasía Rosada, Negramoll, and Tintilla are preferred; also authorised are Bastardo Negro / Baboso Negro, Cabernet Sauvignon, Listán Prieto, Merlot, Moscatel Negro, Pinot Noir, Ruby Cabernet, Syrah, Tempranillo, and Vijariego Negro
 White: Albillo, Bermejuela / Marmajuelo, Forastera Blanca, Doradilla, Gual, Malvasía Volcánica, Malvasía Aromática, Moscatel de Alejandría, Sabro, Verdello, Vijariego / Diego are preferred; also authorised are Bastardo Blanco / Baboso Blanco, Breval, Burrablanca, Listán Blanco, Pedro Ximénez, Torrontés

References

External links
 D.O.P. Valle de la Orotava official website

Wine regions of Spain
Spanish wine
Appellations
Wine classification
Canary Islands cuisine
Tenerife